Hinayana (sometimes stylized as HINAYANA) is an American Melodic death metal/doom metal band from Austin, Texas. Hinayana was originally formed as a one-man project in 2014 by vocalist/guitarist Casey Hurd, who released Endless the same year.  Hinayana rounded out their lineup and released their debut full-length, Order Divine, in 2018. In 2020, Hinayana signed to Napalm Records. Their first release under Napalm Records, the Death of the Cosmic EP, has a release date of August 28, 2020. Hinayana's current lineup is: Casey Hurd (vocals/guitar), Erik Shtaygrud (guitar), Daniel Vieira (drums), Michael Anstice (keyboard), and Matt Bius (bass).

Origin and History 
Vocalist/guitarist Casey Hurd formed Hinayana as a one-man project in 2014. The word “Hinayana” is a Sanskrit word, meaning the “smaller vehicle” or “lesser path” to enlightenment. In the context of the band name, it was chosen to represent the inner struggle and suffering one must conquer to find the truth in every aspect of life, nature, the esoteric, and the universe – seeing both the beautiful and not-so-beautiful sides of it all. Eventually rounding out a full line-up, Hinayana self-released their debut full-length album, Order Divine, in 2018. Hinayana has shared the stage with acts such as Eluveitie, Ensiferum, Septicflesh, Carach Angren, Mors Principium Est, Alestorm, Gloryhammer, and others. In October 2018, Hinayana entered into a Re release and distribution deal with Black Lion Records (Sweden). The band began working on material for a new EP, titled Death of the Cosmic in 2019 and signed with Napalm Records in 2020. Hinayana will release their EP under the record label on August 28, 2020. The first single and music video from the EP, Cold Conception, was released on July 7, 2020.

Endless (Demo) - 2014 
Casey Hurd wrote and recorded the Endless (Demo), released August 28, 2014. This is Hinayana's first official release and leading to Hurd beginning to flesh out a full lineup, including current guitarist Erik Shtaygrud and drummer Daniel Vieira. The runtime is 29:37, and consists of 5 tracks. Once Hurd recruited the full band, a music video for Bringers of the Dawn was released on October 10, 2016. The music video was shot and produced by drummer Daniel Vieira.

Order Divine - 2018 
After filling out a full line-up, including adding keyboardist Michael Anstice, Casey Hurd went to work on the band's first full-length album, Order Divine. Hurd recorded guitars, bass, and vocals, and Daniel Vieira recorded drums. The album was recorded, mixed, and mastered by Kevin Butler at Orb Recording Studios. A music video for Order Divine was released on March 12, 2018 to promote the release of the album on March 19, 2018. The video was shot and produced by drummer Daniel Vieira. A music video for The Window was released on December 3, 2018, and was shot by Vieira and produced by Vieira and Hurd. Order Divine has a run time of 33:15, and includes 7 tracks. It was distributed worldwide by Black Lion Records (Sweden).

Death of the Cosmic EP - 2020 
Hinayana began working on the follow-up to Order Divine in 2019, while playing shows throughout Texas. They also picked up their current bass player, Matt Bius. Released on August 28, 2020, Death of the Cosmic EP is Hinayana's first release under Napalm Records. The EP was primarily self-produced by the band, with mixing/drum recording from Kevin Butler and mastering by Swallow the Sun's Juho Raiha. Guitars and bass were written/recorded by Casey Hurd, and Erik Shtaygrud wrote/recorded the solos on Death of the Cosmic and Cold Conception. The EP features guest appearances by late Tengger Cavalry frontman Nature Ganganbaigal (Cold Conception) and Hanging Garden's Toni Toivonen (In Sacred Delusion). Death of the Cosmic EP features 5 songs, including a re-recording of Pitch Black Noise. A music video for Cold Conception was released on July 7, 2020 and immediately received positive feedback. The video concept was developed by Hurd, and was directed and edited by Chris Thompson.

Hurd explains that the EP "is based on the severed connection between ourselves and the cosmic, spiritual force in the universe and the loss of hope for the cold, modern world man has created in nature’s place. Sonically, we wanted to make something that was beautiful but crushing at the same time, demonstrated in the title track of this EP, which in concept might be viewed as a microcosm of the whole EP itself. Something we tried to do was stray away from some of the more cliché elements of melodic death metal and instead focus on what is the very root/core of HINAYANA and what gives the band its own sound". The album art was done by Travis Smith.

References 

Melodic death metal
Musical groups established in 2014
Musical groups from Austin, Texas
2014 establishments in Texas